Terra Brasilis is the 11th album by Antônio Carlos Jobim. It was recorded at the RCA Recording Studios in New York City and released in 1980. The album includes reworkings of old songs as well as new material and placed 42nd on the US Jazz Albums 1980 year-end chart.

Track listing
 "Vivo Sonhando" (Gene Lees) –3:00
 "Canta Mais (Sing Once More)" (Vinicius de Moraes) –4:32
 "Olha Maria (Amparo)"  –4:04
 "One Note Samba" (Jon Hendricks, Newton Mendonça) –2:17
 "Dindi" (Aloísio de Oliveira, Ray Gilbert) –4:13
 "Quiet Nights of Quiet Stars (Corcovado)" (Lees) –3:26
 "Marina"  –2:41
 "Desafinado" ("Off Key") (Lees, Mendonça) –3:24
 "Você Vai Ver" ("You'll See") –2:55
 "Estrada Do Sol" (Dolores Duran) –2:04
 "The Girl from Ipanema" (de Moraes, Norman Gimbel) –4:47
 "Double Rainbow"  –4:04
 "Triste"  –3:03
 "Wave"  –3:39
 "Someone to Light Up My Life" (de Moraes, Gene Lees) –3:03
 "Falando de Amor" ("Speaking of Love")  – 3:39
 "Two Kites" –4:36
 "Modinha" (de Moraes) –3:37
 "The Song of the Sabiá (Sabiá)" (Chico Buarque, Gimbel) –4:04
 "This Happy Madness (Estrada Branca)" (de Moraes, Lees) –2:49

All songs composed by Antônio Carlos Jobim, lyricists indicated.

Personnel 

 Antônio Carlos Jobim – vocals, piano, electric piano, guitar
 Bob Cranshaw – double bass
 Mike Moore – bass
 Pascoal Meirelles – drums
 Grady Tate – drums
 Rubens Bassini  – percussion
 Bucky Pizzarelli –  guitar
 Claus Ogerman – arranger/conductor

References

1980 albums
Antônio Carlos Jobim albums
Bossa nova albums
Albums arranged by Claus Ogerman
Warner Records albums